This is a list of U.S. metropolitan areas by their gross domestic product (GDP).

Real GDP for the top 50 metropolitan statistical areas in millions of dollars

See also

 List of U.S. states by economic growth rate
List of U.S. metropolitan areas by GDP per capita

References

External links

United States Government
United States Census Bureau
2010 United States Census
USCB population estimates
United States Office of Management and Budget

Lists of cities by GDP
Metropolitan areas by GDP
Metropolitan areas by GDP